Pietro Pedranzini was an Italian Lieutenant of the First Italian War of Independence and the Third Italian War of Independence. He was one of the main commanders behind the Operations in Valtellina and received a Gold Medal of Military Valor for his service.

Childhood
Pietro was born on 9 October 1826 in Bormio, the son of a peasant family with five older sisters and two younger brothers. When he was 11, his father died but still managed to attend several major elementary schools. In 1842, he attended the re-opened gymnasium at Bormio but dropped out during his third year to resume work in the field.

First Italian War of Independence
In 1847, he managed to evade from the Austrian draft due to heart disease. At the beginning of 1848, the National Guard was established in Bormio and on 20 March a squad of about twenty men went to the Stelvio to guard the border with Switzerland. Pedranzini also participated in supplying Austrian weapons to the Italian forces. The same year, the Provisional Government of Milan carried out the draft of the classes of 1826 and 1827 with Pedranzini being enlisted with the rank of corporal and assigned to the first bersaglieri company of the battalion of Valtellina conscripts. He participated in the garrison of the position of the Stelvio Pass in 1848 and participated in the proclamation of the Republic of Stelvio-Tonale on 12 August 1848. During the middle of August however, he had to abandon his positions due to the arrival of the Austrians. Pedranzini and the men of his team - almost all soldiers from the Bormio district - were among the last to abandon the garrison by retreating through the Cristallo Glacier (descending to Bormio via the Cristallo Pass (or Ables d'Ardof Pass ), having now occupied the Braulio Valley by the Austrians.

Second Italian War of Independence
In 1856 he was married and by 1859, due to having two children, he couldn't volunteer for the Second Italian War of Independence. In 1859, the Austrians occupied the Giogo dello Stelvio and the Alta Valle del Braulio, garrisoning the IV Cantoniera and the summit of Spondalunga, recruiting about sixty workers in Bormio and its surroundings to carry out fortification works. Once Garibaldi's redshirts of 8-9,000 men commanded by Nino Bixio and Alessandro Natale Medici arrived in Bormio, Pedranzini, having obtained information from some escaped workers of the Austrian contingent, submitted a plan to Bixio to retake the Giogo with a bold circumventing and surprising action through the Passo del Cristallo to be conducted with seven to eight hundred men chosen among the best. Bixio dismissed the proposal however, calling it a Una ragazzata, ("A bad girl").

Expedition of the Thousand and Political Career
In 1861, during the Expedition of the Thousand, a battalion of the National Guard under Major Giovan Battista Caimi was mobilized in Valtellina for the garrison of Bologna. Pedranzini enlisted with the rank of sergeant, serving for two months as an instructor.

Returning from service in the National Guard with the rank of lieutenant, he participated in the municipal elections of the Municipality of Bormio in which he obtained the highest number of votes and was senior councilor until 1864, the year in which he assumed the position of municipal secretary, a job he held until shortly before his death in 1903.

Third Ttalian War of Independence

In 1866, as a lieutenant of the National Guard, he commanded the second squad consisting of eleven soldiers and two carabinieri, for the surveillance of the Stelvio Pass which left on the evening of 20 June to head there. On the 22nd, the garrison was reinforced by ten Forest Guards accompanied by Inspector Giuseppe Cetti and by other 26 National Guards who arrived under the command of Lieutenant Francesco Clementi. On the 23rd, Colonel Enrico Guicciardi, commander of the newly established legion of the National Guard formed by the 44th (Vallecamonica) and 45th (Valtellina) battalions, arrived at the Stelvio Pass with Major Giovan Battista Caimi, inspector of the GN and commander of the Valtellina battalion. On leaving, Guicciardi ordered a retreat to prevent a clash with Austrian soldiers.

Around the same time however, Bormio was subjected to raids, abuse and slavery by the Austrian troops who had their headquarters at the Stelvio Pass on the border with Italy. Wanting to put an end to this violence, on 11 July 1866 Pedranzini, alone, climbed the Cima Reit for a passage that was later known as the "Pedranzini Pass" named after him. The passage descended from the scree of Glandadura towards the Stelvio Pass at the height of The Cantoniera. Pedranzini then blew the horn, fired a muzzle-loading rifle and rolled several boulders to create a great fuss, frightening the 65 Austrians commanded by a lieutenant who take refuge and lock themselves up in the entrance hall of the Cantoniera.<ref name="Bormio">

Pedranzini ordered them to surrender, one by one he had to lay down their arms and in columns and prisoners, bringing them back to Bormio. After this action, Bormio was no longer harassed by the Austrians. For these events, Pedranzini on 19 April 1867 was awarded the Gold Medal of Military Valor "with an annual increase of two hundred lire."<ref name="Bormio">

Medal Citation

References

Bibliography

1826 births
1903 deaths
Italian Army officers
19th-century Italian politicians
People from the Province of Sondrio
People of the First Italian War of Independence
Members of the Expedition of the Thousand
People of the Third Italian War of Independence
Recipients of the Gold Medal of Military Valor